Traminda obversata is a species of moth of the  family Geometridae. It is found in Africa south of the Sahara and on the islands of the Indian Ocean.

Its colour is olive green at natural light and dark turquoise with flashlight.  Its wingspan is approx. 24–30 mm.
The males have white, bipectinated antennae.

Subspecies
 Traminda obversata obversata, (Walker, 1861) – from mainland Africa
 Traminda obversata atroviridata, (Saalmüller, 1880) – that occurs in Madagascar, Comoros and Réunion.

References

External links
  Live picture on Flickr

Moths described in 1861
Cosymbiini
Moths of Madagascar
Moths of Sub-Saharan Africa
Lepidoptera of West Africa
Moths of the Comoros
Moths of Réunion